TPC Louisiana is an 18-hole golf course in the southern United States, located in Avondale, Louisiana, a suburb southwest of New Orleans.

Opened  in 2004, it was designed by renowned golf course architect Pete Dye in consultation with tour professionals Steve Elkington and Kelly Gibson. TPC Louisiana has been part of the PGA Tour's Tournament Players Club network since its second season, and hosts the tour's Zurich Classic of New Orleans in the spring.

Scorecard

References

External links
 
 Zurich Classic of New Orleans – official site

Golf clubs and courses in New Orleans
Golf clubs and courses designed by Pete Dye
Buildings and structures in Jefferson Parish, Louisiana
2004 establishments in Louisiana